Keladi Chennamma was the queen of Keladi Jainism  Kingdom in Karnataka. She took birth in the household of a man called Siddappa Shetty, who was a native merchant in the region of Kundapur, Karnataka. She was from the Lingayatha  Jain community. Chennamma married King Somashekara Nayaka in 1667 CE. After Somashekhara Nayaka's death in 1677, Chennamma efficiently handled the administration of the Keladi Nayaka dynasty. During her reign of 25 years, she repelled the advance of the Mughal Army led by Aurangzeb from her military base in the kingdom of Keladi located in Sagara, Karnataka, India. She adopted Basavappa Nayaka, one of her close relatives who succeeded as Hiriya Basappa Nayaka. She also rendered a trade agreement with the Portuguese involving commodities like pepper and rice.  
Channagiri is named after her.

She also permitted Portuguese to establish churches at Mirjan, Honnavara, Chandravara and Kalyanpura. In the state of Karnataka, she is celebrated along with Rani Chennabhairadevi, Abbakka Rani, Kittur Chennamma, Belawadi Mallamma and Onake Obavva, as the foremost  women warriors and patriots.

Attack by Aurangazeb 
She provided shelter to Rajaram Chhatrapati, son of Shivaji who was fleeing from the Mughal emperor Aurangzeb after a meeting with her cabinet and treated Rajaram with respect, but Aurangazeb attacked Keladi. In the battle that followed, Keladi Chennamma fought off the Mughal threat to her kingdom and the battle with Mughals ended in a treaty. A subordinate of Keladi Kingdom, Sadasiva of Swadi also helped Rajaram through a loan.   Keladi kingdom was probably the last to lose autonomy to Mysore rulers and subsequently to British.  Her cabinet was headed by Timmanna Naik, who was the descendant of a commander of Vijayanagara.

Legacy
She is considered as the epitome of the Kannada women's valor along with Belwadi Mallamma, Rani Abbakka, Onake Obavva and Kittur Chennamma.

Chennamma was known to be a very virtuous and pious woman, and a pragmatic administrator of her times.

In popular culture
 Keladi Chennamma (TV series), a Kannada language historical series broadcast on Suvarna TV.

References 

1696 deaths
17th-century Indian women
17th-century Indian people
17th-century women rulers
17th-century Indian monarchs
Hindu monarchs
Indian female royalty
Indian women in war
Kannada people
Lingayatism
Women in 17th-century warfare
Nayakas of Keladi